Haikou Port New Seaport is a seaport located around 1 km north of South Port, Haikou, Hainan, China. It has 8 passenger and cargo berths, and a capacity for one million vehicles and 6 million passengers annually. It will become the main port receiving ships from Guangdong. The project began construction on December 25, 2015. It officially opened January 26, 2017. The total investment in the project is 3.8 billion yuan.

Gallery

References

Ports and harbours of Hainan
Buildings and structures in Haikou
Ferry terminals in China